Giuseppe Ravizza, a prolific typewriter inventor, was born in Novara, Italy in 1811 (died 1885), and spent nearly 40 years of his life obsessively grappling with the complexities of inventing a usable writing machine. He called his invention  because of its piano-type keys and keyboard. The story of the 16 models he produced between 1847 and the early 1880s is described in The Writing Machine and illustrated from Ravizza’s 1855 patent, which bears similarities to the later upstroke design of the Sholes and Glidden typewriter.

In 1868, the American Christopher Latham Sholes (1819-1890) patented, on behalf of Remington, a typewriter that was based on principles similar to those of the Ravizza machine. The  could type upper or lower case too, a feature not present in the Remington machine.

References

1811 births
1885 deaths
19th-century Italian inventors